Ananda Aluthgamage is a Sri Lankan politician and a member of the Parliament of Sri Lanka. He was elected from Kandy District in 2015.

References

Living people
Members of the 15th Parliament of Sri Lanka
Sri Lanka Podujana Peramuna politicians
Politicians from Kandy
Year of birth missing (living people)